Sasindran Muthuvel (born 5 July 1974) is the Current Governor  for West New Britain Province and former Minister of State Owned Enterprises in Papua New Guinea The Governor in Papua New Guinea is equivalent to the position of the Chief Minister in India. And equivalent to the position of Premier in Australia

He is the first person of Indian origin to be elected to the Parliament of Papua New Guinea in 2012. He was honored with the initiation as Chief "Swara", a major clan in Central Nakanai in West New Britain province of Papua New Guinea and also received the Pravasi Bharatiya Samman, the highest honour awarded to an Indian citizen overseas, by the President of the Republic of India, Hon. Pranab Mukerjee in 2014.

Prior to elections, Muthuvel was the Managing Director of Hamamas Trading Ltd, a retail Chain in West New Britain province.

References

Governors of West New Britain Province
Members of the National Parliament of Papua New Guinea
People from Tamil Nadu
Tamil politicians
1974 births
Living people
Recipients of Pravasi Bharatiya Samman